Edílson Abdala Júnior or simply Edílson (born January 25, 1987 in Uberaba), is a Brazilian attacking midfielder of Palestinian descent. He currently plays for Marília Atlético Clube.

He previously played for Clube Atlético Mineiro, where he was loaned to Clube de Regatas Brasil for the 2008 Campeonato Alagoano tournament.

References

1987 births
Living people
Sportspeople from Minas Gerais
Brazilian people of Palestinian descent
Brazilian footballers
Clube Atlético Mineiro players
Esporte Clube Democrata players
Clube de Regatas Brasil players
FC Mika players
Expatriate footballers in Armenia
Armenian Premier League players
Association football midfielders